Lantuel is a farmstead in the parish of Withiel, Cornwall, England.

See also

 List of farms in Cornwall

References

Farms in Cornwall